Shell Point is a point in the U.S. state of Washington.

Shell Point was so named on account of clam and oyster shells.

References

Landforms of Thurston County, Washington
Headlands of Washington (state)